Hasanabad Rural District is a rural district (dehestan) in Hasanabad District, Eqlid County, Fars Province, Iran. At the 2006 census, its population was 7,421, in 1,535 families.  The rural district has 17 villages.

References 

Rural Districts of Fars Province
Eqlid County